The long-crested eagle (Lophaetus occipitalis) is an African bird of prey. Like all eagles, it is in the family Accipitridae. It is currently placed in a monotypic genus Lophaetus. It is characterized by the feathers making up the shaggy crest. It is found throughout mid- to southern-Africa with differing home ranges due to food availability and suitable habitat area but lives mainly on forest edges and near moist areas. Breeding usually occurs year-round depending on food availability with 1 to 2 eggs being laid as is characteristic by raptors. Furthermore, as a raptor species, they commonly eat smaller mammals, however other vertebrates and invertebrates are also consumed.

Description

The long-crested eagle is a distinctive eagle when perched due to the long, shaggy crest and all dark plumage often called Kamusungu-sungu in Uganda. The adults are blackish-brown with long, thin feathers growing from the rear of the crown which are held erect to form a crest. The secondary feathers are black barred with light grey and with broad black tips, the primary feathers and median underwing coverts are white, forming a noticeable white patch on the upper and lower surfaces of the wing which is visible in flight. The tail is black, barred with pale grey. The eyes of adults are bright yellow but can be darker in females, and the cere and feet are yellow, paling to white in males. The juveniles are similar to the adults, but the plumage is lighter in color and the crest is not developed and their eyes are grey.

Distribution
The long-crested eagle occurs in sub-Saharan Africa from Senegal and Gambia eastwards to Ethiopia and south to the Eastern Cape, in South Africa, northern Namibia and northern Botswana. It is generally regarded as sedentary, but in arid areas may be nomadic depending on the rains.

Habitat

The long-crested eagle is a bird of forest edges and moist woodland, particularly if that habitat is near to grassland, marsh, a river or a stream; it can also be found in drier woodland, mixed farmland, grazing land, the edges of sugar-cane plantations and orchards. Long-crested eagles will also use exotic plantations such as those of pine or eucalyptus.

Home Ranges 
The home ranges in KwaZulu-Natal (KZN) in South Africa of male long-crested eagles is between 0.56 to 11.6 kilometers2 and the home range of females is 0.5 to 15.08 kilometers2. Some individuals in KZN were observed to be 20 km away from the center of their home range. In the Mpumalanga Province, the home range has been reported to be between 25 to 35 kilometers2. Long-crested eagles in Zimbabwe have been studied to have a home range of 40 to 65 kilometers2. Finally, within these home range sizes, the mean distance travelled in a study by Maphalala et al. was about 2 kilometers due to their sit and wait approach discussed in the food section below.

Behaviour

Breeding
The long-crested eagle is territorial and the male displays during courtship in which he performs steep dives and also uses a rocking, level display flight, they call frequently during these displays. Both sexes build the nest, constructing a stick platform with a bowl-shaped depression in the centre which is lined with green leaves. The nest is normally situated in the mid-canopy and very close to the trunk of a tree near the forest edge. If available, the long-crested eagle will often reuse the nest of another bird, for example, the black sparrowhawk or lizard buzzard. It breeds all year but most eggs are laid in July–November. The female lays 1-2 eggs, and she takes most of the burden of incubating them, incubation lasting 42 days, as she incubates the male provides her with food. As is normal in birds of prey the eggs are laid asynchronously, as much as two weeks apart, and the female begins incubation as soon as the first egg is laid which means that hatching is also asynchronous. When the young hatch they are initially mainly fed by the male. The period from hatching to fledging is about 53 days, and the juveniles remain dependent on the adults for about a further 2–3 months. The nests have been recorded as being preyed upon by monkeys Cercopithecus spp  and genets.

Long-crested eagles breed throughout the year if enough food is available. They also maintain their nesting territories throughout the year, however, females have been shown to leave the territory during the non-breeding season. Furthermore, home ranges during the breeding season have been observed to be smaller and expand during the non-breeding season. Females forage closer to their chicks and travel farther to find their meals as the chicks grow and can fend for themselves. There are potential competitors for the long-crested eagles nest including black sparrow hawks and Egyptian geese. Nesting space itself is also competed for by other raptorial species, including black kites, Wahlberg's eagles, jackal buzzards, and African harrier-hawks.

Food
Up to 98% of the diet of the long-crested eagle consists of rodents. In southern Africa the rodents taken included greater cane rat (Thryonomys swinderianus), vlei rats Otomys spp., African marsh rat (Dasmys incomtus) and four-striped grass mouse (Rhabdomys pumilio). Birds, including owls and the young of other raptors, frogs and lizards, invertebrates and even fish and fruit were also recorded as forming part of the diet of this species.

The long-crested eagle is a "sit and wait" hunter which waits on a perch, scanning the ground and swoops on prey with a gliding flight when it come to the bird's notice.

Taxonomic notes
Although currently placed in the monotypic genus Lophaetus recent research has suggested that this species forms a clade with the spotted eagles, greater spotted eagle (Clanga clanga), Indian spotted eagle (Clanga hastata)  and lesser spotted eagle (Clanga pomarina). The merged genus would be called Lophaetus but most authorities regard that further work on the classification of the booted eagles is required and retain the long-crested eagle in the monotypic Lophaetus. The lineage of Lophaetus is thought to have diversified in a period between 5 to 7 million years ago. C

Conservation 
The population is estimated to be in the tens of thousands with an increasing population trend.  New areas of suitable habitat are being made for rodents due to habitat fragmentation and thus their food source is increasing which as a result is expected to cause an upward population trend in the long-crested eagle. Although the long-crested eagle is listed as least concern according to the IUCN Red List, the species still encounters threats. These include habitat fragmentation and loss, poisoning, and accidents with power lines or vehicles. A more recent threat to the long-crested eagle is the high abundance of doves which contain trichomoniasis or canker. Predation of the doves by these eagles is becoming increasingly common, passing on the infection and causing major damage to the crop, pharynx, and mouth. Therefore, humans feeding doves leads to increase in dove populations and thus more disease spread to eagles.

References

External links
 Long-crested eagle - Species text in The Atlas of Southern African Birds

long-crested eagle
long-crested eagle
Birds of prey of Sub-Saharan Africa
long-crested eagle